Fore Abbey is the ruin of a Benedictine Abbey, situated to the north of Lough Lene in County Westmeath, near Fore village. The abbey was founded by Saint Feichin in 630 CE and functioned for over 900 years. By 665 CE (the time of the yellow plague), the abbey is believed to have housed up to 300 Benedictine monks from Normandy and 2000 students. Architectural additions and damage by fire have altered the site's appearance and layout over the centuries.
 
Fore is the anglicised version of the Irish "Fobhar", meaning "water-springs". The name is derived from St. Feichin's spring or well which is next to the old church, a short distance from the ruined monastery. The site is referenced in the Annals of Inisfallen (AI) as "Repose of Fechtnach of Fobar". The Ó Cibhleacháin clan were recorded as the coarbs of the Monastery at Fore.

A Benedictine Priory
In the 13th century Hugh de Lacy, Lord of Meath the Norman and landlord built a Benedictine priory in the valley nearby. Many of the buildings that remain today (in ruins) are from the 15th century and have been restored throughout this century, making Fore Abbey the largest group of 300 Benedictine to have sojourned and remained in Ireland. This priory was dedicated to both St Feichin and St Taurin, the Évreux, Normandy abbot of the parent monastery.
 Its 13th century church still has some decorations and graceful arcaded cloisters.
 Attached to the church are the broken walls of two towers, where the monks once lived.
 Between 771 and 1169 Fore Abbey was burnt 12 times by pillaging invaders, such as the Turgesius led Vikings.

Seven Wonders of Fore
The abbey is also noted for what local populations call its seven wonders: 
The monastery built upon the bog.
The mill without a race (St. Fechin reportedly induced water to flow from the ground and operate a mill that had no visible water supply - in reality water from Lough Lene flows through the ground).
The water that flows uphill. (St. Fechin reportedly used his staff to make the water flow uphill)
The tree that has three branches/the tree that won't burn. Pilgrims place coins in it, giving it the name "the copper tree."
The water that doesn't boil in St Fechin's holy well.
The anchorite in a cell 
The lintel-stone raised by St. Fechin's prayers.

Another important aspect of Fore is the Fore Crosses one of which is in the village of Fore. There are 18 crosses; some crosses are plain (most likely due to wind and rain erosion) whilst others still remain carved. These are spread out over 7 miles on roadways and in fields and bore witness to religious persecution during penal times.

Gallery

See also
 Fore, County Westmeath
 List of abbeys and priories in Ireland (County Westmeath)

References 

Churches in County Westmeath
Archaeological sites in County Westmeath
Christian monasteries established in the 7th century
Benedictine monasteries in the Republic of Ireland
Tourist attractions in County Westmeath
Ruins in the Republic of Ireland
Former populated places in Ireland
National Monuments in County Westmeath
Ruined abbeys and monasteries
Churches completed in 630
7th-century churches in Ireland